William Emil Hess (February 13, 1898 – July 14, 1986) was an American lawyer and politician who served three lengthy, non-consecutive stints as a Republican and a U.S. Representative from Ohio between 1929 and 1961.

Biography 
Born in Cincinnati, Ohio, February 13, 1898; attended the public schools, the University of Cincinnati, Cincinnati, Ohio, and Cincinnati Law School; during the First World War served in the United States Army as a private; was admitted to the bar in 1919 and commenced the practice of law in Cincinnati, Ohio, the same year; member of the Cincinnati City Council 1922–1926.

He was elected as a Republican to the Seventy-first and to the three succeeding Congresses (March 4, 1929 – January 3, 1937); unsuccessful candidate for reelection in 1936 to the Seventy-fifth Congress.

He resumed the practice of law; elected to the Seventy-sixth and to the four succeeding Congresses (January 3, 1939 – January 3, 1949); from early 1940 until the attack on Pearl Harbor, Hess was an interventionist and advocated helping Great Britain in the second world war.  Hess was an unsuccessful candidate for reelection in 1948 to the Eighty-first Congress; elected to the Eighty-second and to the four succeeding Congresses (January 3, 1951 – January 3, 1961); was not a candidate for renomination in 1960; resumed the practice of law; was a resident of Cincinnati, Ohio, until his death there on July 14, 1986; interment in Spring Grove Cemetery. Hess voted in favor of the Civil Rights Acts of 1957 and 1960.

References

External links 

 

1898 births
1986 deaths
United States Army personnel of World War I
Burials at Spring Grove Cemetery
Cincinnati City Council members
Ohio lawyers
Politicians from Cincinnati
United States Army soldiers
University of Cincinnati alumni
University of Cincinnati College of Law alumni
20th-century American politicians
20th-century American lawyers
Republican Party members of the United States House of Representatives from Ohio